Michael Garvin may refer to:

 Michael J. Garvin (1861–1918), American architect
 Michael Ray Garvin (born 1986), American football wide receiver